The Institute of Finance Management (IFM) is a public Institute in Tanzania established in 1972. It stands as the oldest higher learning financial institution in Tanzania. The institute has been involved in teaching, research, and consultancy.

Faculties 
The Institute of Finance Management has four main faculties as of 2020:
 Faculty of Computing Information Systems and Mathematics.
 Faculty of Economics and Management Science.
 Faculty of Accounting, Banking and Finance.
 Faculty of Insurance and Social Protection.

IFM Main campus is located in Dar es Salaam City Centre, Shaaban Robert Street, opposite the National Museum of Tanzania.

The Institute of Finance Management has four campuses which are allocated in different area.
 Dar es Salaam, Main Campus.
 Mwanza Campus.
 Dodoma Campus.
 Simiyu Campus.

Programmes offered 
The institute provide training different levels from postgraduate level to Basic technician level as shown below:

Masters Progammes
 Master of Science (MSc) in Accounting and Finance.
 Master of Science (MSc) in Finance and Investment.
 Master of Science (MSc) in Human Resources Management.
 Master of Science Insurance and Actuarial Science.
 Master of Science in Social Protection Policy and Development.
 Master of Business Administrations (MBA) International Business programme in collaboration with Indian Institute of Foreign Trade (IIFT), New Delhi, India
 Master of Science in Information Technology and Management (MSc.ITM), in collaboration with Avinashilingham University for Women, India.

Diploma Progammes
 Ordinary Diploma in Computer Science.
 Ordinary Diploma in Information Technology.
 Ordinary Diploma in Banking and Finance.
 Ordinary Diploma in Accounting.
 Ordinary Diploma in Taxation.
 Ordinary Diploma in Insurance and Risk Management.
 Ordinary Diploma in Social Protection.

Basic Technician Certificate Progammes
 Basic Technician Certificate in Accounting.
 Basic Technician Certificate in Banking and Finance.
 Basic Technician Certificate in Computing and Information Technology.
 Basic Technician Certificate in Insurance and Social Protection.
 Basic Technician Certificate in Taxation.

Gallery

References 

1972 establishments in Tanzania
Higher education in Tanzania